Great Transition is used by the Great Transition Initiative and its predecessor, the Global Scenario Group (GSG), to describe a vision of a just and sustainable global future. The term was originally coined by Kenneth E. Boulding in The Meaning of the 20th Century – The Great Transition (1964) and describes the shift from pre-modern to post-modern culture, and the four possible courses of action that these organizations believe will allow humanity to successfully manage the Great Transition. 

Elements of the Great Transition vision include egalitarian social and ecological values, increased inter-human connectivity, improved quality of life, and a healthy planet, as well as the absence of poverty, war, and environmental destruction. The Great Transition concept was cited by Prime Minister of Bhutan Jigme Thinley, Josh Ryan-Collins of the New Economics Foundation, and the Capital Institute. It was used as a theme for the 2011 SmartCSOs conference on strategies for Civil Society Organisations in London.

History
The Great Transition was first introduced by the Global Scenario Group (GSG), an international body of scientists convened in 1995 by the Tellus Institute and Stockholm Environment Institute to examine the requirements for a transition to a sustainable global society. The GSG set out to describe and analyze scenarios for the future of the earth as it entered a planetary phase of civilization.

Great Transition Initiative

Further development of Great Transition scenarios is carried on by the Great Transition Initiative (GTI). Launched in 2003, GTI is a global network of several hundred scholars, intellectuals, civil society leaders, and activists working to develop visions and pathways for a “Great Transition" to a future of equity, solidarity and ecological sustainability. The Initiative was relaunched as an online journal and discussion network in 2014.

See also
 Anthropocene
 Global Citizens Movement
 Planetary boundaries
 Transition town
 Eco-communalism
 Tellus Institute

References

Publications

 Parris, Thomas. "Bytes of Note: A Crystal Ball for Sustainability." Environment: Science and Policy for Sustainable Development. 44, no. 7 (2002): 3-4. 10.1080/00139150209605799#.VZmxB0bLdyE http://www.tandfonline.com/doi/abs/10.1080/00139150209605799#.VZmxB0bLdyE.
 Rajan, Chella, Global Politics and Institutions. Boston: Tellus Institute, 2006.
 Raskin, Paul. GT Today: A Report from the Future. Boston: Tellus Institute, 2006.
Raskin, Paul. Journey to Earthland: A Great Transition to Planetary Civilization. Boston: Tellus Institute, 2016.
 Revkin, Andy. Human Impact on the Earth - How Do We Soften It? [International Herald Tribune]. September 4, 2002. 
 Stutz, John. The Role of Well-Being in a Great Transition. Boston: Tellus Institute, 2006.
 White, Allen. Transforming the Corporation. Boston: Tellus Institute, 2006.

External links 
 Great Transition Initiative
 Global Scenario Group
 Popular Science - Four Futures - an article in Popular Science about the Great Transition and three other GSG scenarios, with infographics
 Video - Visions of a Sustainable World - a YouTube video with highlights from an interview with Dr. Paul Raskin of GSG and the Tellus Institute (from a speaker series at Yale University)

Economics of sustainability
Sustainable development
Social justice
Environmental movements